Monyreak Oum (June 22, 1981 – February 1, 2015) was an American web-based animator and writer.

Oum attracted attention within the gaming community after releasing an animated video in 2007, titled Haloid, where characters from the Halo and Metroid video game franchises fight against each other, which went viral. In October of the same year, he released  a follow-up, Dead Fantasy. Oum began working for Rooster Teeth, serving as the lead animator for Red vs. Blue, and creating the original animated series RWBY.

Oum had a severe allergic reaction and fell into a coma in January 2015. He died on February 1, 2015, in Austin, Texas.

Early life

Oum was born in Providence, Rhode Island in 1981. He was of Cambodian, Vietnamese, Chinese, and Japanese heritage. He had four older brothers (including Neath, who took over voicing RWBY character Lie Ren after Oum's death) and two older sisters. As a teenager, he was a student at New Urban Arts, a community art studio for high school students in Providence.

Career

Independent work
Oum dropped out of high school and began putting together fan videos as early as 2002. In January 2007, he discovered some reverse engineering techniques online that allowed him to extract models from Halo 2 and, utilizing assets from Super Smash Bros. Melee, created the "ultimate showdown" between a SPARTAN (Halo) and Samus Aran (Metroid) in Haloid, a portmanteau of their respective franchises. The videos garnered a significant number of views online. Later in 2007, Oum produced a series called "Dead Fantasy" in which characters from Final Fantasy and Dead or Alive fight.

Industry work
Two months after the premiere of Haloid, many gaming companies sought Oum, and he was eventually hired by Midway Games as a combat designer. In 2008 he was hired by Namco Bandai Games as a combat designer and animator for Afro Samurai. The brief experience in the gaming industry frustrated Oum, and in 2009, he met Rooster Teeth co-founder Burnie Burns at a panel during San Diego Comic-Con International and the two discussed the possibility of Monty working for the company. It wasn't until PAX East 2010 that it was announced that Oum had been hired as an animator for the company's long-running web series Red vs. Blue.

His next work, the animated series RWBY, featured highly involved and fantastical combat sequences between super-powered characters that garnered a following online. RWBY was a commercial success for Rooster Teeth, and critical reviews highlighted the high quality of its animated fight scenes. Two seasons of the show were produced, with a third in production at the time of Oum's death in early 2015. The show has now run for eight seasons, with a ninth in production.

Death
On January 22, 2015, Oum had an unspecified severe allergic reaction during a "simple medical procedure". On January 30, Rooster Teeth co-founder Burnie Burns stated that Oum was "in critical care and it is not known if he will recover". A donation page was set up for the medical expenses on GoFundMe, which received over $210,000. On February 1, 2015, at 4:34 PM, Oum reportedly died as a result of said allergic reaction. He was 33 years old.

Filmography

Accolades

References

External links

 

1981 births
2015 deaths
Accidental deaths in Texas
Actors from Providence, Rhode Island
Animators from Rhode Island
American directors
American animated film directors
American male screenwriters
American male voice actors
American male web series actors
21st-century American male actors
American people of Cambodian descent
American people of Chinese descent
American people of Japanese descent
American artists of Vietnamese descent
American people of Vietnamese descent
Animators from Texas
Artists from Austin, Texas
Artists from Providence, Rhode Island
Respiratory disease deaths in Texas
Deaths from anaphylaxis
Male actors from Austin, Texas
Rooster Teeth people
RWBY
Writers from Austin, Texas
Writers from Providence, Rhode Island
Screenwriters from Rhode Island
Screenwriters from Texas